The Tacoma Sabercats were an American professional minor league ice hockey team based in Tacoma, Washington. The team began play in the West Coast Hockey League as of the 1997–98 season.

Tacoma immediately emerged as a power in the WCHL, winning the regular season Northern Division title and reaching the league finals in its first season. However the Sabercats were defeated by the defending champion San Diego Gulls in the league's Taylor Cup finals.

The following season, 1998–99, Tacoma won its second WCHL Northern Division title and defeated the Gulls in the Taylor Cup finals, becoming the first team other than San Diego to win the WCHL title in the league's history. Although the Sabercats won the WCHL Northern Division a third time in 1999–2000, the team failed to win another league championship.

Despite a strong following in the Tacoma area with over 1,500 season ticket holders, the Sabercats were folded in May 2002 by owner Coach-Sports. They had been eliminated by the Idaho Steelheads in the 2002 WCHL playoffs immediately before ceasing operations.

Season-by-season record 
Note: GP = Games played, W = Wins, L = Losses, OTL = Overtime losses, SOL = Shootout losses, Pts = Points, GF = Goals for, GA = Goals against, PIM = Penalties in minutes

Final records.

References 

Defunct ice hockey teams in the United States
Sports in Tacoma, Washington
Ice hockey clubs established in 1997
Sports clubs disestablished in 2002
West Coast Hockey League teams
Ice hockey teams in Washington (state)
1997 establishments in Washington (state)
2002 disestablishments in Washington (state)